Elections to the French National Assembly were held in French Somaliland on 23 April 1967 as part of the wider French parliamentary elections. Moussa Ali Abdoulkader was elected as the territory's MP.

Results

References

French Somaliland
1967 in French Somaliland
Elections in Djibouti
April 1967 events in Africa